Rodrigo Gastón Mieres Pérez (born 19 April 1989) is a Uruguayan professional footballer who plays as a defender for C.A. Progreso.

Club career
Mieres' career began in his homeland with Defensor Sporting of the Primera División. He made his bow on 25 April against Montevideo Wanderers, which turned out to be his sole match for the club. Mieres spend the 2010–11 season out on loan with Rentistas, featuring twelve times. Brazil's Toledo completed the loan signing of Mieres on 9 January 2013. He scored on his starting debut in the Campeonato Paranaense, netting the winner in a 2–1 victory over Arapongas in March. A total of eight appearances arrived with Toledo. He returned to Uruguay later that year, subsequently joining top-flight Sud América.

Having scored one goal in thirteen fixtures for Sud América in the 2013–14 season, Mieres was loaned to Ecuadorian Serie A team Deportivo Cuenca in January 2014. Twelve months later, Primera B Nacional's Atlético Tucumán of Argentina done likewise. He played full seasons for both sides, scoring against Liga de Loja and Sportivo Belgrano respectively, as he notably won the league title, and subsequent promotion, with Atlético Tucumán. Mieres went back to Uruguay in early 2016 with Sud América, but soon sealed a return to Argentina after agreeing a move to Central Córdoba in July.

Central Córdoba suffered relegation from the 2016–17 Primera B Nacional, though Mieres stayed in the second tier after being signed by Quilmes - a team just relegated from the Primera División. A sixty-two minute appearance against Juventud Unida was the defender's only feature in the 2017–18 campaign, after suffering a knee ligament injury in the match.

International career
Mieres was selected by Uruguay for the 2009 FIFA U-20 World Cup in Egypt, though didn't make an appearance as they were eliminated in the round of sixteen by Brazil. A year previous, Mieres was selected for the L'Alcúdia International Tournament.

Career statistics
.

Honours
Rentistas
Segunda División: 2010–11

Atlético Tucumán
Primera B Nacional: 2015

References

External links

1989 births
Living people
Footballers from Paysandú
Uruguayan footballers
Uruguay youth international footballers
Uruguay under-20 international footballers
Association football defenders
Uruguayan expatriate footballers
Uruguayan Primera División players
Uruguayan Segunda División players
Ecuadorian Serie A players
Primera Nacional players
Defensor Sporting players
C.A. Rentistas players
Central Español players
Toledo Esporte Clube players
Sud América players
C.D. Cuenca footballers
Atlético Tucumán footballers
Central Córdoba de Santiago del Estero footballers
Quilmes Atlético Club footballers
Juventud de Las Piedras players
C.A. Progreso players
Expatriate footballers in Brazil
Expatriate footballers in Ecuador
Expatriate footballers in Argentina
Uruguayan expatriate sportspeople in Brazil
Uruguayan expatriate sportspeople in Ecuador
Uruguayan expatriate sportspeople in Argentina